Peter Dews may refer to:
Peter Kenneth Dews (born 1952), British philosopher
Peter Dews (director) (1933–1997), English stage director
Peter B. Dews (1922–2012), American psychologist and pharmacologist